The 2008 European Sevens Championship was a rugby sevens competition, with the final held in Hanover, Germany. It was the seventh edition of the European Sevens championship and also functioned as a qualifying tournament for the 2009 Rugby World Cup Sevens. The event was organised by rugby's European governing body, the FIRA – Association of European Rugby (FIRA-AER).

Outcome

The finals tournament held in Hanover, Germany on 12 and 13 July 2008, as well as being the European Sevens Championship, functioned as a qualifying tournament for the world cup. England, France and Scotland had already qualified through their past performance. The five best nations out of the twelve participating ones qualified for the Dubai tournament. Teams finished in the following order:

Bid
On 16 June 2007, the FIRA congress in Monaco decided to award the finals tournament to Hanover, beating bids from Russia, Greece and Bosnia-Herzegovina in the process.

Tournament history
From 2002, FIRA, the governing body of European rugby, has been organising an annual European Sevens Championship tournament. A number of qualifying tournaments lead up to a finals tournament, which functions as the European championship and, in 2008, also as the qualifying stage for the Sevens World Cup.

The first European Championship was held in 2002 in Heidelberg, Germany, and was won by Portugal, the team that won every championship since except 2007, when Russia won.

The next year, the tournament was again held in Heidelberg and in 2004, Palma de Mallorca, Spain was the host.

From 2005 to 2007, Moscow was the host of the tournament.

Hanover held the tournament for the first time in 2008 and will do so again in 2009.

Tournament

Stadium

The finals tournament was held at the AWD-Arena in Hanover, home ground of the football club Hannover 96. The stadium holds 50.000 spectators, 43,000 of them on seats, the rest standing.

The tournament was seen by over 30,000 spectators, a good turn out in a country like Germany, where rugby is not a mainstream sport. After selling more than 35,000 tickets in advance, mostly within Germany, the organisers were forced to open up the upper tier of the stadium to meet demand.

Qualifying
Twelve teams qualified through the seven qualifying tournaments, held at the following locations:

Source:

Group stage
The tournament was divided into a group and a finals stage. In the group stage, two groups of six teams were drawn. Within each group, each team played each other once. The top two teams went to the Cup stage of the tournament while the third and fourth placed team qualified for the Plate stage. Five and six went to the Bowl finals.

Group A

Group B

Finals
Three separate rounds of finals were held, Bowl, the lowest, Plate and Cup. The semi final winners of each group went on to the final while the losers played each other. All teams from the Cup stage were qualified for the next sevens world cup and also the Plate winner.

Bowl
Winner: Russia

Plate
Winner: Italy (qualified for the 2009 Sevens world cup)

Cup
Winner: Portugal (all four teams qualified for the 2009 Sevens world cup)

Top point scorers

Key: Con = conversions; Pen = penalties; Drop = drop goals

Teams

Belgium
Head coach: Neil Massinon

Manager: Thierry Massinon

Source:

Georgia
Head coach: Kakhaber Alania

Source:

Germany
Head coach:  Lofty Stevenson 

Source:

Ireland
Head coach: Jon Skurr

Source:

Italy
Head coach:

Source:

Poland
Head coach:

Source:

Portugal
Head coach:  Tomaz Morais

Source:

Romania
Head coach:

Source:

Russia
Head coach:  Claude Saurel

Source:

Spain
Head coach: José Ignacio Inchausti

Source:

Ukraine
Head coach: Michel Bishop

Source:

Wales
Head coach:  Gareth Baber

Source:

References

External links

 Portugal lead Euro charge to 2009 RWC Sevens IRB website – Article on the 2009 Sevens world cup qualifying
 Hannover sevens website 
 FIRA-AER official website

2008
International rugby union competitions hosted by Germany
European
2008–09 in European rugby union
2008–09 in German rugby union
Rugby union in Hanover